Donald Joseph Savage (April 9, 1928 - January 27, 2010) was an American former professional basketball player. Savage was selected in the second round (14th overall) in the 1951 NBA Draft by the Syracuse Nationals after a collegiate career at Le Moyne College. Besides two different seasons with the Nationals, Savage also played for the Elmira Colonels of the American Basketball League.

References

External links
Don Savage @ TheDraftReview
Le Moyne Hall of Fame entry

1928 births
2010 deaths
American Basketball League (1925–1955) players
American men's basketball players
Basketball players from New York (state)
Le Moyne Dolphins men's basketball players
People from Manlius, New York
Small forwards
Syracuse Nationals draft picks
Syracuse Nationals players